Antártica is a Chilean commune in Antártica Chilena Province, Magallanes y la Antártica Chilena Region, which covers all the Chilean Antarctic Territory (the territory in Antarctica claimed by Chile). It ranges from 53°W to 90°W and from the South Pole to 60°S, overlapping the Argentine and British Antarctic claims, and is the largest and least populated commune in Chile, being over 25 times the size of the next largest commune, Natales. It is administered by the Cabo de Hornos municipality in the South American mainland.

Antártica was created on July 11, 1961, and was dependent on the Magallanes Province until 1975, when the Antártica Chilena Province was created, making it dependent administratively on Puerto Williams, the province capital.

Demographics
The population fell by 11.5% (15 people) between the 2002 and 2012 censuses. This does not include the staff of non-Chilean bases in the area.

Census districts
The commune consists of two census districts:

Piloto Pardo (pop. 114), consisting of the South Shetland Islands and named after Luis Pardo, with the only civil settlement, Villa Las Estrellas.
Tierra de O'Higgins (the Antarctic mainland) (pop. 16), with communal capital Puerto Covadonga (O'Higgins Station).

Administration
The commune is governed from Puerto Williams in the Cabo de Hornos commune from its municipal office located at O'Higgins 165. Chilean law allows a municipality to govern more than one commune, however, this is the only such case. As a commune, Antártica is a third-level administrative division of Chile administered by a municipal council, headed by an alcalde who is directly elected every four years. The 2016-2020 alcalde is Patricio Fernández (DC). The communal council has the following members:

Daniel Fernando Valdebenito Contreras (PS) Ángela Barría Barrientos (RN) Juan Velásquez (PS) Carolina Guenel González (DC) Francis Delgado Ibaceta (RN) Paola Speake Ojeda (DC)

Within the electoral divisions of Chile, Antártica is represented in the Chamber of Deputies by Juan Morano (PDC) and Gabriel Boric (Ind.) as part of the 60th electoral district, which includes the entire Magallanes y la Antártica Chilena Region. The commune is represented in the Senate by Carlos Bianchi Chelech (Ind.) and Carolina Goic (PDC) as part of the 19th senatorial constituency (Magallanes y la Antártica Chilena Region).

See also
 Chilean Antarctic Territory
 Antártica Chilena Province
 Magallanes y la Antártica Chilena Region
 Punta Arenas
 Territorial claims in Antarctica
 Argentine Antarctica and Tierra del Fuego Province
 British Antarctic Territory
 Antarctic Treaty System
 Antarctic Peninsula
 Diego Ramirez Islands

References

Communes of Chile
Populated places in Antártica Chilena
1961 establishments in Chile